Khristo Dimitrov Furnigov (born November 25, 1966 in Granitovo, Lovech) is a retired boxer from Bulgaria, who competed for his native country at the 1988 Summer Olympics in Seoul, South Korea. There he was defeated in the quarterfinals of the Men's Welterweight Division (– 67 kg) by Kenya's eventual gold medalist Robert Wangila.

References
 sports-reference

1966 births
Living people
Welterweight boxers
Light-welterweight boxers
Olympic boxers of Bulgaria
Boxers at the 1988 Summer Olympics
Bulgarian male boxers